Jeffrey Allen Wilkins (born April 19, 1972), nicknamed "Money", is a former American football placekicker for the San Francisco 49ers, Philadelphia Eagles and St. Louis Rams of the National Football League (NFL). With the Rams, he won Super Bowl XXXIV over the Tennessee Titans. He played college football for Youngstown State University.  Wilkins is currently tied for second place all time in most consecutive PATs without a miss at 371.

Early life
Wilkins played for Austintown Fitch High School in the Austintown, Ohio suburb of Youngstown.

College career
At Youngstown State University, Wilkins made a school record 66 field goals, with a long of 54 (a school record).  While at Youngstown State, the Penguins won the 1991 and 1993 Division I-AA National Championships under future Ohio State head coach Jim Tressel.  Wilkins was inducted in the YSU Sports Hall of Fame in 2003.

Professional career
Wilkins signed with the Philadelphia Eagles in 1994, but played in just six games and did not attempt a single field goal or extra point.  The following season, he joined the 49ers.  While he only played in seven games, he had a superb season, kicking 12 of 13 field goals.  In 1996, he finally saw duty as his team's full-time kicker and did not disappoint, kicking 30 of 34 field goals and all 40 extra point attempts.

In 1997, he joined the Rams, where he played the remainder of his career and became the team's all-time leading scorer.  Wilkins assisted his team to a championship win in Super Bowl XXXIV, kicking three of four field goals and two extra points in the Rams 23–16 win over the Tennessee Titans.  He also kicked a 50-yard field goal in the Rams 20–17 loss in Super Bowl XXXVI.

Some consider Wilkins to be the last player to kick barefoot in the NFL, doing so for the first seven games of the 2002 season. However, many years later, Wilkins told ESPN writer Sam Borden that he did not consider himself to have been a barefoot kicker because his kicking foot was so heavily taped as a short-lived attempt to fix his kicking woes, and that he himself did not consider himself among the lineage of barefoot kickers.

In 2003, Wilkins kicked an NFL record-tying 39 field goals (then shared with former Miami Dolphins, New Orleans Saints, Seattle Seahawks and Chicago Bears kicker Olindo Mare), which stood until surpassed by Neil Rackers' 40 field goals in 2005.

In St. Louis' opening game of the 2006 season, Wilkins set a franchise record by kicking six field goals in their 18–10 win over the Denver Broncos.  He also became the first Rams player ever to score over 1,000 points.

On November 11, 2007, Wilkins kicked his 300th career field goal against the New Orleans Saints.  Wilkins announced his retirement from the NFL on February 29, 2008.

NFL career statistics

References

1972 births
Living people
American football placekickers
National Conference Pro Bowl players
Philadelphia Eagles players
St. Louis Rams players
San Francisco 49ers players
Youngstown State Penguins football players
Players of American football from Youngstown, Ohio